Young Hickory Township is one of twenty-six townships in Fulton County, Illinois, USA.  As of the 2010 census, its population was 618 and it contained 283 housing units.

Geography

Cities, towns, villages
 London Mills (south three-quarters)

Extinct towns
 Midway at 
(These towns are listed as "historical" by the USGS.)

Cemeteries
The township contains these three cemeteries: Beer, East Midway and West Midway.

Major highways
  Illinois Route 116

Demographics

School districts
 Avon Community Unit School District 176
 Spoon River Valley Community Unit School District 4

Political districts
 Illinois' 17th congressional district
 State House District 94
 State Senate District 47

References
 
 United States Census Bureau 2007 TIGER/Line Shapefiles
 United States National Atlas

External links
 City-Data.com
 Illinois State Archives

Townships in Fulton County, Illinois
Townships in Illinois